James Reeves Kelley is a judge of the Pennsylvania Commonwealth Court.  He was a Democrat member of the Pennsylvania State Senate from 1974 to 1988.

He attended St. Vincent College and the Columbus School of Law at Catholic University of America.  He was a County Commissioner in Westmoreland County from 1968 to 1974.  He was a Pennsylvania State Senator from 1974 to 1988.  He was appointed to be a judge of the Commonwealth Court of Pennsylvania in 1990 and was elected to a full term in 1991.

References

Democratic Party Pennsylvania state senators
Judges of the Commonwealth Court of Pennsylvania
Columbus School of Law alumni
Saint Vincent College alumni
Living people
1932 births
Westmoreland County Commissioners (Pennsylvania)